{{DISPLAYTITLE:C2H3ClO2}} 
The molecular formula C2H3ClO2 may refer to:

 Chloroacetic acid, organochlorine carboxylic acid and building-block in organic synthesis
 Methyl chloroformate, the methyl ester of chloroformic acid